Alessandro Motti (born 21 February 1979) is an Italian professional tennis player who specialises in doubles. He has a career high doubles ranking of world No. 91, achieved on 14 September 2009.

Motti reached his only ATP World Tour doubles final at the age of 38, partnering Tuna Altuna at the 2017 Istanbul Open. They lost it to Roman Jebavý and Jiří Veselý with a so-called double bagel.

ATP career finals

Doubles: 1 (1 runner-up)

ATP Challenger and ITF Futures titles

Doubles: 39

Doubles performance timeline

Current through the 2018 Ecuador Open Quito.

References

External links
 
 
 

1979 births
Living people
Italian male tennis players